Kuljit Singh Nagra(born August 31, 1965) is an Indian politician. Currently he is Member of the Legislative Assembly of Fatehgarh Sahib since 2017, and associated with the Indian National Congress.  As a professional, he is an Advocate in Punjab and Haryana High Court and a Member of High Court Punjab and Haryana Bar Association Chandigarh.

Political career

Currently, he is a sitting Member of Legislative Assembly from Fatehgarh Sahib, Punjab.
He has also held the President post of Kissan-Khet Mazdoor Congress Punjab and been in charge of Programmes of All India National Students' Union of India. He is elected member of PCC from Block Khera of Fatehgarh Sahib Assembly constituency. Previously he was General Secretary of Indian Youth Congress (IYC) and elected Punjab Pradesh Congress Committee (PPCC) Member from 2007 to 2010. He graduated from Panjab University (1996 -2000), where he was elected as a Senate Member of the constituency. He was a General Secretary of Punjab Youth Congress from 1995 to 1997. Also, he served as an In-charge of the Harchandpur Assembly of Rae Bareli parliamentary constituency from where Smt. Sonia Gandhi Ji contested elections.

Student Political Achievements
Mr. Nagra has been active in politics since his time in college, where he held the position of chairman in Panjab University Students Union (PUSU) from 1995 to 1998. He was Convener for Students Association of North Zone Universities from 1992 to 1994. He was elected as a President for Panjab University Students Council of Session 1992–93. He was also convener for  Panjab University Students Consultative Committee (PUSCC) from 1989 to 1992 and also held the Chairman post of Northern University Student Coordination Committee from 1991 to 1992.
He has been President of Panjab University Campus Students Council, Chandigarh from 1989 to 1995. He was the Founder President of All India Law Students Association. He also has held the President post of Khalsa College Students Union, Chandigarh from 1985 to 1986. He was a Zonal in charge of the Indian Youth Congress (IYC) to oversee and coordinate the election work in the 2002 Punjab Legislative Assembly Election.

Organization work in Punjab

He has been actively organizing social work and doing protests for the public's sake. He has organized Kisaan Chetna Rallies in almost every district of Punjab. He organized Dharna at Chunni on Chandigarh-Sirhind road against the Akali-BJP Government against inadequate supply of electricity to farmers of Fatehgarh Sahib & submitted memorandum to District Administration in 2010.
Additionally, he actively participated in Shaheedi Jor Mela conferences held every year at Fatehgarh Sahib, where he organized massive protest for Sanipur Charnathal road construction at GT road Sirhind in 2008. He was the organizer of Agitation against Government who falsely implicated several dalits during Municipal Corporation, Sirhind elections and got them justice in 2007, organized Chetna Rallies in many districts as Fatehgarh Sahib, Ludhiana, Moga, Pattran, and Patiala.

Intellectual Activities
He has participated in many intellectual activities such as the Chaired Global Opportunity Program with the focus country as "Croatia" organized by ISCD. He was invited to the International Students Youth Conference in Romania. He attended a youth meeting in Chicago (USA) in Dec. 2004 and also attended "Bharat Ekta Shivir", the national training camp of the Indian Youth Congress held at New Delhi from 27 to 29 November 1997.

Cultural Activities

He has organized many cultural activities such as the North Zone Inter-University Youth Festival on behalf of Association of Indian University (AIU) in Session 1992–93 at Panjab University Campus, Chandigarh and All India Inter-University Youth Festival "Jhankar" in Session 1987–88, 1989–90 and 1991–92 at Punjab University Campus.

References 

Punjab, India MLAs 2017–2022
1965 births
Living people